Mount Creak is a sharp peak,  high, just north of Shoulder Mountain in the south end of the Kirkwood Range. It was discovered by the British National Antarctic Expedition, 1901–04, which named this peak for Captain E.W. Creak, Director of Compasses at the Admiralty.

References
 

Mountains of Victoria Land
Scott Coast